The Jonte is a  river in southern France. It flows through the departments of Lozère and Aveyron. It is a tributary of the Tarn, which it joins in Le Rozier.

Departments and communes along the river:
 Lozère: Meyrueis, Le Rozier
 Aveyron: Peyreleau

References

Rivers of France
Rivers of Occitania (administrative region)
Rivers of Lozère
Rivers of Aveyron